Severe Tropical Cyclone Vaianu was the fourth named tropical cyclone of the 2005–06 South Pacific cyclone season. The system formed on February 11, and moved generally towards  the south throughout its life. Vaianu ultimately peaked with winds corresponding to Category 1 status on the Saffir-Simpson Hurricane Scale, and passed between Fiji and Tonga. Moving into cooler waters, the storm dissipated on February 16. Although the cyclone avoided land for the most part, it caused heavy rainfall and gusty winds in portions of Tonga. Flooding hit the capital city of Nuku'alofa, and on some islands, the storm destroyed crops.

Meteorological history

The depression tracked southeastward, although further development was initially inhibited by wind shear. During the next day, the depression turned towards the southeast and moved into a more favorable environment for intensification. It was then designated as Tropical Depression 11P at 1800 UTC by the Joint Typhoon Warning Center (JTWC). On February 11, the system significantly organized, and at 1200 UTC that day, RSMC Nadi reported that the depression had intensified into a Category 1 tropical cyclone on the Australian tropical cyclone intensity scale; it was assigned the name Vaianu.

The storm turned southwestward under the steering currents of a ridge to the southeast. The JTWC recognized the system as a tropical storm on February 12, and upgraded it into a tropical cyclone shortly thereafter. Vaianu continued to strengthen, and passed west of Tonga. The JTWC reported that the cyclone peaked in intensity at 1200 UTC on February 13, with maximum sustained 1-minute winds of 140 km/h (85 mph). RSMC Nadi assessed the storm as having peaked slightly later, with 10-minute winds of 130 km/h (80 mph), which made it a Category 3 severe tropical cyclone.

The storm held its strength for some time as it moved southward between Ono-i-Lau and Tongatapu. Beginning to accelerate, Vaianu entered the area of responsibility of the Tropical Cyclone Warning Centre in Wellington, New Zealand. It curved southeastward and slowly deteriorated due to increasing wind shear and colder sea surface temperatures. The JTWC downgraded it to a tropical storm on February 15, and by the next day it was undergoing extratropical transition. At 0600 UTC, the JTWC classified it as extratropical, but it remained a powerful storm system for several days as it tracked over the open ocean.

Preparations and impact

Early on February 10, RSMC Nadi placed Niuafo'ou and Niuatoputapu under a tropical cyclone alert, before early the next day extending the alert to the whole of Tonga. Later that day the Vavau, Haapai, and Nomuka islands were placed under a gale warning. The warnings stayed in force until late on February 12 when the gale warning was canceled, and concurrently, southern Tonga was placed under a tropical cyclone warning. These warnings were canceled on February 14. During the cyclone, RSMC Nadi placed the Lau Islands under a strong wind warning, and a damaging swell warning was declared for Fiji. Businesses in Nuku'alofa closed as the storm passed by.

At the Fuaʻamotu station, sustained winds blew at  during the worst of the storm, with gusts reaching . Since the cyclone remained predominantly over water, its effects were limited. Nonetheless, portions of Tongan experienced torrential rainfall and high winds. On Tongatapu and Eua, the storm inflicted extensive crop damage, and it is estimated that 70% of the banana crop was destroyed. While little property damage took place, the storm caused power outages across its path that took up a week to fully restore. In Nuku'alofa, the capital of Tonga, flooding of low-lying areas reportedly shut down the city for two days. The high winds brought down trees and dispersed debris throughout the region, while schools were forced to close.

See also

2005–06 South Pacific cyclone season

References

External links

2005–06 South Pacific cyclone season
Tropical cyclones in Tonga
Category 3 South Pacific cyclones
Vaianu